Chip Lake is a large lake in west-central Alberta.  The Lobstick River flows through the lake.  It in turn is a tributary of the Pembina River, which eventually flows into the Athabasca River.

Poison Creek flows into the north-west corner of Chip Lake.  It drains Beta Lake and Sunset Lake.  Prior to entering Chip Lake, the Lobstick River takes on Brule and Little Brule Creeks.

The Yellowhead Highway (Highway 16) passes along the south shore of Chip Lake.  The small town of Wildwood can also be found on the lake's south shore.

References

See also
List of lakes in Alberta

Lakes of Alberta
Yellowhead County